The Mental Hospital and Institutional Workers' Union was a trade union in the United Kingdom.

The union was established as the National Asylum Workers' Union in 1910 by asylum attendants in Lancashire.  George Gibson became its General Secretary in 1912, and served in post for the remainder of the union's existence.

In 1918 it organised strikes at Prestwich Hospital, Whittingham Hospital and Bodmin Hospital. It threatened to organise strikes in all the London asylums in support of a 48-hour week.

In 1916, the union lost its membership in Southern Ireland to the Irish Mental Hospital Workers' Union.  In 1931, it changed its name to the "Mental Hospital and Institutional Workers Union".

In 1946, the union merged with the Hospital and Welfare Services Union to form the Confederation of Health Service Employees (COHSE).  By this stage, it had secured a very high membership amongst mental hospital staff, including the vast majority of mental hospital nurses

References

External links
Catalogue of the MHIWU archives, held at the Modern Records Centre, University of Warwick

Trade unions established in 1910
Trade unions disestablished in 1946
1946 disestablishments in the United Kingdom
Defunct trade unions of the United Kingdom
Healthcare trade unions in the United Kingdom
1910 establishments in the United Kingdom
Former mental health organisations in the United Kingdom
Trade unions based in Greater Manchester